The 2019 Chesapeake Bayhawks season was the last season for the Bayhawks franchise of Major League Lacrosse, and tenth season using the 'Chesapeake' Bayhawks moniker. It is Dave Cottle's second season of his second tenure as head coach of the team. In 2018, Cottle led the Bayhawks to their first playoff appearance in five years.

The Bayhawks wanted to look to get back to the postseason again, after posting a 9-5 record in 2018, a season that ended in disappointment after a 13-12 home semifinal loss to the eventual champion Denver Outlaws.

Transactions

Offseason
October 2018 - The Bayhawks select 15 players in the league's first supplemental draft, including five Ohio State Buckeyes.
March 13, 2019 - The Bayhawks resign attackman Steele Stanwick to a one-year contract extension.
March 24 - 12 players are added to the preseason roster following the league's dispersal draft. The most notable addition was Nick Mariano. Nick formerly played under his brother Tom, who was the head coach for the Florida Launch before league contraction. Tom, who led the Launch to the franchise's only postseason appearance in 2017, was announced as an assistant coach for the Bayhawks just a day before.

In-season
July 2 - The Bayhawks trade midfielder Adam Osika to the Dallas Rattlers in exchange for Ryan Keenan.
July 11 - Faceoff specialist Noah Rak is acquired from the New York Lizards in exchange for defenseman Matt Borges and a fifth round draft pick in the 2020 collegiate draft.
August 7 - Recently-acquired Noah Rak is traded to the Rattlers in exchange for a fifth round draft pick in the upcoming collegiate draft.

Collegiate Draft
The 2019 Collegiate Draft was held on March 9 in Charlotte, North Carolina at the NASCAR Hall of Fame. Inside Lacrosse gave the Bayhawks an "A+" in their team-by-team draft grades, the only team receiving such high marks. One reason was for drafting likely Tewaaraton Award winner Pat Spencer from Loyola.

Schedule

Standings

References

External links
 Team Website 

Major League Lacrosse seasons
Chesapeake Bayhawks